George E. Henderson (August 23, 1894 – January 1978), nicknamed "Rube", was an American Negro league pitcher in the 1920s.

A native of Wilson County, Virginia, Henderson made his Negro leagues debut in 1921 for the Chicago Giants, Detroit Stars, and Cleveland Tate Stars. He went on to play two more seasons with Cleveland through 1923. Henderson died in Charlottesville, Virginia in 1978 at age 83.

References

External links
 and Baseball-Reference Black Baseball stats and Seamheads

1894 births
1978 deaths
Date of death missing
Chicago Giants players
Cleveland Tate Stars players
Detroit Stars players
20th-century African-American sportspeople
Baseball pitchers